Piet Rooijakkers (born August 16, 1980 in Gerwen, North Brabant) is a road bicycle racer from the Netherlands. He retired after the 2010 season after his previous team  did not offer him a contract extension.

Biography
After Rooijakkers finished his Bachelor's degree in business in 2002, he decided to find a part-time job so he would have enough time for cycling. In 2003, he joined the cycling team "Lowik Meubelen-Tegeltoko". He started the Olympia's Tour in that same year, but fell in the fifth stage and could not race for the remainder of the season.

He returned for the 2004 season and won the Criterium of Lieshout and finished third in the Dutch National Amateur Road Race Championships ('vrije renners'). In that same year Rooijakkers won four races.

Rooijakkers started in the 2009 Tour de France, where he fell during the 4th stage (a team time trial). He broke his arm and had to retire from the race.

Major results

2003
 2nd Ronde van Overijssel
2004
 2nd Ronde van Overijssel
 6th Overall Olympia's Tour
 9th Hel van het Mergelland
2005
 1st Stage 9 Olympia's Tour
 4th Ronde van Overijssel
 9th Overall Ster Elektrotoer
 10th Noord-Nederland Tour
2006
 5th Road race, National Road Championships
 6th Omloop van het Houtland
 9th Overall Danmark Rundt
2007
 5th Overall Tour of Britain
 5th Overall Four Days of Dunkirk
2008
 1st Stage 1b (TTT) Brixia Tour
 5th Nationale Sluitingprijs
 7th Overall Ster Elektrotoer
2009
 5th Overall Ster Elektrotoer
 10th Overall Tour Méditerranéen
2010
 6th Batavus Prorace

References

External links
Profile on Skil-Shimano official website

1980 births
Living people
Dutch male cyclists
People from Nuenen, Gerwen en Nederwetten
Cyclists from North Brabant
20th-century Dutch people
21st-century Dutch people